Tomáš Topinka (born 5 June 1974) is a Czech motorcycle speedway rider who participated in Speedway World Cups for Czech Republic team.

Speedway Grand Prix results

Career details

World Championships 

 Individual World Championship (Speedway Grand Prix)
 1994 - 10th place in World Semi-Final 2
 1997 - 22nd place (2 points in one event)
 2003 - 26th place (13 points in one event)
 Team World Championship (Speedway World Team Cup and Speedway World Cup)
 1997 -  Piła - 5th place (10 pts)
 2002 -  Peterborough - 5th place (3 pts)
 2003 -  - 6th place
 2004 -  - 6th place
 2005 - 6th place
 Individual U-21 World Championship
 1993 -  Pardubice - 8th place (7 pts)
 1994 -  Elgane - 4th place (12 pts +2)
 1995 -  Tampere - 4th place (12 pts +2)

See also 
 Czech Republic national speedway team
 List of Speedway Grand Prix riders

References 

Czech speedway riders
1974 births
Living people
Oxford Cheetahs riders
Sportspeople from Prague